The 1994 College Football All-America Team is composed of the following All-American Teams: Associated Press, United Press International, Football Writers Association of America, American Football Coaches Association, Walter Camp Foundation, Scripps-Howard, The Sporting News and Football News.

The College Football All-America Team is an honor given annually to the best American college football players at their respective positions. The original usage of the term All-America seems to have been to such a list selected by football pioneer Walter Camp in the 1890s. The NCAA officially recognizes All-Americans selected by the AP, AFCA, FWAA, WCFF, and TSN to determine Consensus All-Americans.

Offense

Quarterback
 Kerry Collins, Penn St.  (AP-1, Walter Camp, FWAA-Writers, Scripps-Howard, Sporting News, Football News)
 Eric Zeier, Georgia (AFCA-Coaches)
Kordell Stewart, Colorado (AP-2)
Jay Barker, Alabama (AP-3)

Running backs
 Rashaan Salaam, Colorado (AP-1, Walter Camp, FWAA-Writers, AFCA-Coaches, Scripps-Howard, Sporting News, Football News)
 Ki-Jana Carter, Penn St. (AP-1, Walter Camp, FWAA-Writers, AFCA-Coaches, Scripps-Howard, Sporting News, Football News)
Lawrence Phillips, Nebraska (AP-2)
Napoleon Kaufman, Washington (AP-2)
Andre Davis, TCU (AP-3)
Robert Baldwin, Duke (AP-3)

Wide receivers
 Jack Jackson, Florida (AP-1, Walter Camp, FWAA-Writers, AFCA-Coaches Scripps-Howard, Sporting News, Football News)
 Michael Westbrook, Colorado (Walter Camp, AFCA-Coaches, Sporting News)
 Frank Sanders, Auburn (AP-1, FWAA-Writers, Scripps-Howard)
 Bobby Engram, Penn St. (AP-2, Walter Camp)
 Kevin Jordan, UCLA (AP-3, Football News)
 Alex Van Dyke, Nevada (AP-2)
 Keyshawn Johnson, USC (AP-3)

Tight end
 Pete Mitchell, Boston College (AP-1, Walter Camp, FWAA-Writers, Scripps-Howard, Sporting News)
 Kyle Brady, Penn St. (AP-2, AFCA-Coaches)
 Jamie Asher, Louisville (Football News)
Christian Fauria, Colorado (AP-3)

Guards/tackles
 Zach Wiegert, Nebraska (AP-1, Walter Camp, FWAA-Writers, AFCA-Coaches, Scripps-Howard, Sporting News, Football News)
 Tony Boselli, USC (College Football Hall of Fame) (AP-1, FWAA-Writers, AFCA-Coaches, Scripps-Howard, Sporting News, Football News)
 Korey Stringer, Ohio St.  (AP-1, Walter Camp, AFCA-Coaches, Sporting News, Football News)
 Blake Brockermeyer, Texas (AP-2, FWAA-Writers, Sporting News)
 Brenden Stai, Nebraska (AP-2, Walter Camp, FWAA-Writers)
 Jeff Hartings, Penn St. (AP-1, Walter Camp)
 Ruben Brown, Pittsburgh (AP-2, AFCA-Coaches, Football News)
 Tirrell Greene, Miami (Fl.) (Scripps-Howard)
 Jeff Smith, Tennessee (Scripps-Howard)
Tony Berti, Colorado (AP-3)
Jesse James, Mississippi St. (AP-3)
Jason Odom, Florida (AP-3)
Anthony Brown, Utah (AP-3)

Center
 Cory Raymer, Wisconsin (AP-1, Walter Camp, AFCA-Coaches, Sporting News, Football News)
 Clay Shiver, Florida State (AP-2, FWAA-Writers, Scripps-Howard)
K. C. Jones, Miami (Fl.) (AP-3)

Defense

Ends
 Luther Elliss, Utah (AP-1, Walter Camp, FWAA-Writers, AFCA-Coaches, Scripps-Howard, Sporting News)
 Derrick Alexander, Florida St. (AP-1, Walter Camp, FWAA-Writers)
 Kevin Carter, Florida (AP-2, Walter Camp, Sporting News, Football News)
 Simeon Rice, Illinois (AP-2 [as LB], AFCA-Coaches, Football News)
Mike Pelton, Auburn (AP-2)
Dameian Jeffries, Alabama (AP-2)
Chad Eaton, Washington St. (AP-3)
Marcus Jones, North Carolina (AP-3)
Matt Finkes, Ohio St. (AP-3)

Tackles
 Warren Sapp, Miami (Fla.) (AP-1, Walter Camp, FWAA-Writers, AFCA-Coaches, Scripps-Howard, Sporting News, Football News)
 Tedy Bruschi, Arizona (College Football Hall of Fame) (AP-1, Walter Camp, FWAA-Writers, AFCA-Coaches, Scripps-Howard, Sporting News)
 Ellis Johnson, Florida (Scripps-Howard)
 Dewayne Patterson, Washington State (AP-2, Football News)
Tim Colston, Kansas St. (AP-3)

Linebackers
 Dana Howard, Illinois (AP-1, Walter Camp, FWAA-Writers, AFCA-Coaches, Scripps-Howard, Sporting News, Football News)
 Derrick Brooks, Florida St. (College Football Hall of Fame) (Walter Camp, FWAA-Writers, AFCA-Coaches, Scripps-Howard, Sporting News)
 Ed Stewart, Nebraska (AP-1, Walter Camp, FWAA-Writers, AFCA-Coaches, Scripps-Howard)
 Stephen Boyd, Boston College (Sporting News, Football News)
 Antonio Armstrong, Texas A&M (AP-1, Football News)
 Zach Thomas, Texas Tech (College Football Hall of Fame) (AP-2, AFCA-Coaches)
 Ray Lewis, Miami (Fla.) (AP-3, Football News)
Ted Johnson, North Carolina (AP-2)
Donnie Edwards, UCLA (AP-3)
Mark Fields, Washington St. (AP-3)

Backs
 Bobby Taylor, Notre Dame (AP-3, Walter Camp, AFCA-Coaches, Scripps-Howard, Sporting News, Football News)
 Clifton Abraham, Florida State (AP-1, Walter Camp, AFCA-Coaches, Sporting News, Football News)
 Chris Hudson, Colorado  (AP-1, Walter Camp, FWAA-Writers, Scripps-Howard)
 Tony Bouie, Arizona (Walter Camp, AFCA-Coaches, Sporting News)
 Brian Robinson, Auburn (AP-1, Walter Camp, Football News)
 Greg Myers, Colorado State (AP-2, FWAA-Writers, Scripps-Howard, Sporting News)
 Chris Shelling, Auburn (FWAA-Writers, Scripps-Howard)
 Orlando Thomas, SW Louisiana (AP-2, Football News)
 Ty Law, Michigan, (Walter Camp)
 C. J. Richardson, Miami (Fla.) (AP-1)
 Herman O'Berry, Oregon (FWAA-Writers)
Aaron Beasley, West Virginia (AP-2)
Chad Cota, Oregon (AP-2)
Barron Miles, Nebraska (AP-3)
Ronde Barber, Virginia (AP-3)
Ray Farmer, Duke (AP-3)

Specialists

Placekicker
 Steve McLaughlin, Arizona (AP-3, FWAA-Writers, Scripps-Howard, Sporting News)
 Brian Leaver, Bowling Green (AP-1, Football News)
 Michael Proctor, Alabama (AFCA-Coaches)
 Remy Hamilton, Michigan (AP-2, Walter Camp)

Punter
 Todd Sauerbrun, West Virginia  (AP-1, Walter Camp, FWAA-Writers, AFCA-Coaches, Scripps-Howard, Sporting News, Football News)
Brad Maynard, Ball St. (AP-2)
Jason Bender, Georgia Tech (AP-3)

All-purpose / kick returners
 Leeland McElroy, Texas A&M (AP-All-Purpose-3, Walter Camp, FWAA-Writers, Scripps-Howard, Sporting News)
 Brian Pruitt, Central Michigan (AP-All-Purpose-1)
 Sherman Williams, Alabama (AP-All-Purpose-2)

See also
 1994 All-Big Eight Conference football team
 1994 All-Big Ten Conference football team
 1994 All-SEC football team

References

All-America Team
College Football All-America Teams